Minor Morals for Young People is a work of Children's literature by John Bowring, published in three parts from 1834 to 1839.   The work was illustrated with engravings by George Cruikshank and William Heath.

Background
Sir John Bowring (1792–1872) was an English political economist, traveller, miscellaneous writer, polyglot, and the 4th Governor of Hong Kong.
The work strives to educate as well as entertain. A contemporary reviewer argued that the author "has kept view the establishment and nurture of sound principle in young minds".  The third volume, published in 1839, focused on "Oriental History" and folklore.

Contents and synopsis

Minor Morals is centered on the Howard family—Mr Howard, a wise father and storyteller, his wife ("Mrs. Howard"), and their three children: Arthur, George, and Edith. Mr. Howard imparts various lessons and tales to his children.

Volume I (1834)
 Anger
 Courage
 Generosity
 Intolerance
 Advice-Giving
 Presence of Mind
 Humanity to Animals
 Veracity
 Praise and Blame
 Employment of Time
 Love of FLowers
 Perseverance
 Good-Nature
 Patience under Censure
 Mercy
 Nobility of Skin
 Order
 Justice
 Ancient Times

Volume II (1834)

 The Storm
 Uses of Animals to Man
 Excellence and Excelling
 Slavery
 Swallows
 Love of Home
 Commerce
 Fishes, and Friendly Counsels
 War
 Sense and Sensitiveness
 Mushroom-Hunting
 Selfishness
 Affection for Inanimate Objects
 Prudence
 Flowers
 Filial Affection
 Sounds of the People

Volume III (1839)
The third volume is dedicated to "Lady Ponsonby". In the preface, the author describes his motive to interest children in "the East". The author describes including genuine folklore, writing: "As to the stories connected with Oriental superstitions, I have recorded them as I heard them".

 Travels -  The Howard children dream of traveling to foreign lands. Mr Howard begins by telling stories of his travels, including a visit to Russia
 The Sheriff of Mekka - Mr Howard tells a religious discussion he had with a Turkish friend as a demonstration of the good in all peoples and how travel "destroys petty prejudices". Mr. Howard describes meeting the "Sheriff" (cf. Sharif) of the Holy City and their conversations.
 The Nile - Mr Howard describes an 1837 visit to Egypt's Nile, witnessing a boat accident, crocodiles and a crocodile hunter.
 Peris - Mr Howard tells the story of a tailor and a Peri that fell in love with the tailor. For three years the tailor and the Peri lived together, after which the Peri left to participate in a war amongst the Peri race. The Peri left him and died in the war, and the tailor vowed never to wed an earthly mortal.
 The Prince of the Druses - Mr Howard describes the Druze people
 Treatment of Animals in the East - describes the treatment of dogs and other animals, the eating of locusts, and the legend of the Wandering Jew.
 Vampires -  Mr Howard tells of the Vampire, resulting from "a dead body that... is exposed to the action of the sun's rays" for forty days. A vampire's mission is to "torment and alarm the living". He tells of the vampire hunters, who use a pointed stake through the heart to slay a vampire.
 Mahomet Ali Pacha
 Magicians
 Infant Schools
 Djezzar Pacha
 Mahommedanism
 Djins—Mr. Howard discusses the Djins or genii, which, like ghosts, haunt houses.
 Sincerity with Prudence
 Treasure-seeking in the Levant - Mr. Howard shares the tale of a treasure hunt. Finding a treasure, the treasure hunters use ropes and poles in an attempt to prevent the treasure from sinking into the earth. The attempt fails, the chest crashes into the earth, and a monstrous toad results in the treasure hunter being struck down with palsy.
 Abu Abdallah

References

External links
 Minor Morals for Young People Volume I, Volume II, Volume III at archive.org

19th-century British children's literature
1830s children's books